Valerio Lorenzo de los Santos (born October 6, 1972) is a Dominican former professional baseball pitcher.

Milwaukee Brewers 
De los Santos was originally signed by the Milwaukee Brewers as an amateur free agent in 1993. He started his professional career in the minor leagues in 1995, and spent the next four seasons in the Brewers' farm system, playing for the AZL Brewers, Beloit Snappers, El Paso Diablos, and Louisville Red Birds. He would play in 74 games for the Brewers from 1999 to 2001, and played in 51 games for the team in 2002. He began the 2003 season with the Brewers, and pitched 45 games for the club that year.

Philadelphia Phillies 
On September 2, 2003, the Brewers traded De los Santos to the Philadelphia Phillies in exchange for cash considerations. De los Santos pitched to a 9.00 ERA over 6 games for the Phillies in 2003 and elected free agency on December 21, 2003.

Toronto Blue Jays 
On December 27, 2003, De los Santos signed with the Toronto Blue Jays. In 2004, he pitched to a 6.17 ERA over 17 games for the Blue Jays. He elected free agency on October 28, 2004.

Florida Marlins 
On April 13, 2005, De los Santos signed with the Florida Marlins. On July 9, 2005, pitching in the 9th inning against the Chicago Cubs, de los Santos hit Adam Greenberg directly in the back of his head with a 92 mph fastball on the very first pitch of the plate appearance. "The first thing going through your mind is, 'This guy's dead,'" de los Santos said. Greenberg suffered a concussion as a result of the beaning, and still suffers from positional vertigo. In , he pitched to a 6.14 ERA over 27 games for the Marlins. He was released by the Marlins on August 13, 2005.

Washington Nationals 
On January 27, 2006. De los Santos signed a minor league deal with the Washington Nationals. He was released by the Nationals organization before the season started on March 23, 2006.

Chicago White Sox 
On June 13, 2006, De los Santos signed a minor league deal with the Chicago White Sox. He played for the Triple-A Charlotte Knights for the remainder of the season, carrying a 3.02 ERA over 19 games. He elected free agency on October 15, 2006.

Sultanes de Monterrey 
In , De los Santos signed with the Sultanes de Monterrey of the Mexican League. He pitched in 16 games and had a 4.40 ERA when he was released by the Sultanes.

Dorados de Chihuahua 
Shortly after his release, De los Santos signed with the Dorados de Chihuahua of the Mexican League. He pitched in 3 games for the Dorados and finished the season with the club. He elected free agency at seasons end.

Colorado Rockies 
On February 17, De los Santos signed a minor league deal with the Colorado Rockies. In 2008, he began the year with the Triple-A Colorado Springs Sky Sox. he was promoted to the majors on July 28, . He pitched in 2 major league games before being designated for assignment by the Rockies on August 4. He elected free agency on October 8, 2008.

New York Mets 
On January 29, he signed a minor league contract with the New York Mets. He was released on March 25 after being cut from spring training.

Uni-President 7-Eleven Lions 
Shortly after his release from the Mets, De los Santos signed with the Uni-President 7-Eleven Lions of the Chinese Professional Baseball League. He played in 4 games for the Lions, carrying a 5.87 ERA over 15.1 innings pitched. He won the Taiwan Series with the Lions in 2009 and became a free agent after the season.

Long Island Ducks 
On March 10, 2011, De los Santos signed a contract with the Long Island Ducks. After carrying a 5.23 ERA over 21 games, De los Santos was released on May 10.

Vaqueros Laguna 
On May 26, 2011, De los Santos signed with the Vaqueros Laguna of the Mexican League. He pitched in 28 games, with a 5.81 ERA over 26.1 innings. He became a free agent after the season.

References

External links

1972 births
Living people
Albuquerque Isotopes players
Arizona League Brewers players
Beloit Snappers players
Charlotte Knights players]
Colorado Rockies players
Colorado Springs Sky Sox players
Dominican Republic expatriate baseball players in Canada
Dominican Republic expatriate baseball players in Taiwan
Dominican Republic expatriate baseball players in the United States
El Paso Diablos players
Florida Marlins players
Indianapolis Indians players
Jupiter Hammerheads players

Long Island Ducks players
Louisville Redbirds players
Major League Baseball pitchers
Major League Baseball players from the Dominican Republic
Milwaukee Brewers players
Philadelphia Phillies players
Toronto Blue Jays players
Uni-President 7-Eleven Lions players